Camille Chat (born 18 December 1995) Aka The Neck is a French professional rugby union player. His position is hooker, and he currently plays for Racing 92 in the Top 14.
He was named in the French squad for the 2016 Six Nations Championship.

Honours
 Racing 92
Top 14: 2015–16

References

External links
France profile at FFR
 

1995 births
Living people
French rugby union players
Sportspeople from Auxerre
Rugby union hookers
France international rugby union players
Racing 92 players